The 2018 San Diego State Aztecs football team represented San Diego State University in the 2018 NCAA Division I FBS football season. The Aztecs were led by eighth-year head coach Rocky Long and played their home games at SDCCU Stadium. San Diego State was a member of the Mountain West Conference in the West Division. They finished the season 7–6, 4–4 in Mountain West play to finish in fourth place in the West Division. They were invited to the Frisco Bowl where they lost to Ohio.

Previous season

San Diego State started the season 6–0, where one of the wins is against No. 19 Stanford in front of 43,040 spectators at home on CBS Sports Network. The winning streak resulted the Aztecs ranked in the AP Poll for four consecutive weeks, with the No. 19 ranking as San Diego State's peak. The Aztecs then lost to Boise State and rival Fresno State, and began a new winning streak. The end result was an eighth straight bowl appearance in the 2017 Armed Forces Bowl, where the Aztecs lost to Army 35–42 then finished the season 10–3 overall, and 6–2 in conference play. In spite of a bowl loss, head coach Rocky Long agreed to a contract extension until the 2022–23 school year.

NFL Draft Selections

The Aztecs had two individuals selected in the 2018 NFL Draft.

Recruiting

Position key

Recruits

The Aztecs signed a total of 24 recruits.

Preseason

Award watch lists
Listed in the order that they were released

Mountain West media days
During the Mountain West media days held July 24–25 at the Cosmopolitan on the Las Vegas Strip, the Aztecs were predicted to finish in second place in the West Division.

Media poll

Preseason All-Mountain West Team
The Aztecs had three players selected to the preseason all-Mountain West team.

Offense

Keith Ismael – OL

Tyler Roemer – OL

Defense

Tariq Thompson – DB

Schedule

Sources:

Game summaries

at Stanford

Sacramento State

Arizona State

Eastern Michigan

at Boise State

Air Force

San Jose State

at Nevada

at New Mexico

UNLV

at Fresno State

Hawaii

vs. Ohio (Frisco Bowl)

Honors

Mountain West

Players drafted into the NFL

References

San Diego State
San Diego State Aztecs football seasons
San Diego State Aztecs football